Yvonne Seon (née Reed, formerly Chappelle; born December 20, 1937) is an American professor, university administrator, and Unitarian Universalist minister. She specializes in African studies, African American studies, and government administration. She was an administrative officer in the government of Patrice Lumumba in the Democratic Republic of the Congo, and also worked in the U.S. federal government. She then worked as a university administrator and founded a Black Studies Center at Wright State University, and helped to design one of the first doctoral programs in Black Studies in the United States. In 1981 Seon became the first African American woman to be ordained as a Unitarian Universalist minister.

Early life and education
Seon was born Yvonne Reed, and graduated from Allegheny College with a bachelors degree in 1959. She then received a Woodrow Wilson Fellowship to attend American University, where she studied American government, political science, and French, earning a master's degree.

Government work
Seon met an assistant of Patrice Lumumba at a reception in Washington, D.C., shortly after Lumumba's 1960 election as prime minister of the newly independent Democratic Republic of the Congo. Because of her fluent French and formal education in politics, she was invited to meet with Lumumba, who offered her a role in his cabinet. Seon accepted the position and moved to the Democratic Republic of the Congo, where she lived for two years, from 1961 to 1963. During that time she served as an administrative officer on the High Commission for the Inga Dam, which was the highest governmental role that could be held by somebody who was not a national of the Democratic Republic of the Congo.

Upon her return to the United States in 1963, Seon began working in the Office of International Conferences at the Bureau of International Organization Affairs within the United States Department of State. In that role she was named the secretary of the delegation to the Fourteenth General Assembly of UNESCO, becoming the youngest person, first African-American, and second woman to be secretary of a major US delegation to that body.

Academic and religious career
In the late 1960s, Seon married William David Chappelle III and moved to Yellow Springs, Ohio. In 1968 she began to work as the coordinator of student affairs at Wilberforce University, which was a fraught position due to the centrality of university students to the protests of 1968. She left this position in 1971 to become the founding director of the Bolinga Black Cultural Resources Center at Wright State University. In 1970 Seon became a PhD student at Union Institute & University studying African and African American humanities, and she completed her doctoral degree in 1974. This was one of the earliest Black Studies PhD programs in the United States, and while a student in the program, Seon also helped to establish and design it. Also in 1974, Seon and Chappelle III separated, and she moved to Washington, D.C. where she worked with congressman Charles Diggs.

From 1979 to 1981, Seon studied Divinity at Howard University. She was ordained as a minister in the Unitarian Universalist Church in 1981. This made her the first African American woman to be a Unitarian Universalist minister. In the 1990s, she founded and was the minister of a Unitarian Universalist congregation.

After completing her PhD in African American studies, Seon became a professor in the history department of Prince George's Community College. She retired from Prince George's Community College in 2006, and returned to the Bolinga Black Cultural Resources Center at Wright State University, where she was first Distinguished Visiting Director and then became fulltime director for 2 years.

Personal life 
Seon has three children, one of whom is comedian Dave Chappelle.

Selected works
Totem Games: Poems in Search of African Identity (2007)

Selected awards
African Scientific Institute award
Gold Citation, Allegheny College (2009)

References

1937 births
Living people
American people of Grenadian descent
21st-century American women writers
Unitarian Universalist clergy
Female Unitarian Universalist clergy
African-American religious leaders
American Unitarian Universalists
African-American theologians
African-American academics
American women social scientists
Wright State University faculty
Wilberforce University faculty
Allegheny College alumni
American University alumni
Howard University alumni
Union Institute & University alumni
American women academics
21st-century African-American women writers
21st-century African-American writers
20th-century African-American people
20th-century African-American women